2-Methyl-5-hydroxytryptamine (2-Methylserotonin, 2-Methyl-5-HT) is a tryptamine derivative closely related to the neurotransmitter serotonin which acts as a moderately selective full agonist at the 5-HT3 receptor.

See also 
 5-Carboxamidotryptamine
 5-Methoxytryptamine
 α-Methyl-5-hydroxytryptamine

References 

Serotonin receptor agonists
Tryptamines
Phenols
5-HT3 agonists